The Wackiest Ship in the Army is an American 1960 Eastmancolor CinemaScope comedy-drama war film directed by Richard Murphy and starring Jack Lemmon, Ricky Nelson, and Chips Rafferty. It was filmed at Pearl Harbor and Kauai.

The story is a dramatized, fictionalized account of a real ship known as the USS Echo. It was a sailing vessel that originated in New Zealand and became part of the United States Navy during World War II.

Plot
In 1943, U.S. Navy Lieutenant Rip Crandall, an expert yachtsman in civilian life, is based at Townsville, in Australia. He is surprised to be assigned command of a sailing ship, the USS Echo, a unique ship in the Pacific Fleet. The only crew member who knows how to work a ship with sails is eager young Ensign Tommy Hanson, who cost Crandall a yacht race with a mistake before the war.

Crandall tries to refuse this dubious command, but Hanson and Crandall's former sailing buddy Lieutenant commander Vandewater wear down his resistance. Vandewater points out Crandall's poor fitness report and advises that, if he doesn't take this command, he will never get another. Hanson takes Crandall out drinking with some of the men so he will bond with them and feel guilty about abandoning them.

The Echo barely makes it out of the harbor, sailing straight into a storm. It arrives at Port Moresby, New Guinea, after accidentally sailing into a minefield. Crandall is supposed to train a replacement to deliver a coastwatcher named Patterson to a location only a shallow-draft vessel can reach.  However, the replacement strikes Crandall as stiff-necked and unqualified to handle this kind of mission, so he takes the ship out under his own command.

Making the crossing with both ship and crew disguised as a native trading vessel, Crandall and his crew are spotted and photographed by a Japanese spotter plane. While most of the men are ashore escorting Patterson, a Japanese force from a passing warship boards the boat, capturing Crandall and the skeleton crew; when the landing party returns, they are also apprehended. 

Crandall manages to rally his men to take the ship back. He is wounded and Hanson is faced with the decision of whether to radio a warning about the fleet, even though that will give away their position to guns on shore.  He sends the warning and the decision is made to abandon ship, as the guns open fire on the Echo and destroy her.

The crew survives to be rescued and, for their role in helping to win the Battle of the Bismarck Sea, Crandall is given command of a modern destroyer whilst Hanson gains command of a sub chaser.

Cast

Production notes 
The USS Echo was based on the real-life USS Echo (IX-95), a 40-year-old twin-masted scow (flat-bottomed schooner) that was transferred from the New Zealand government to the United States Navy in 1942, and returned to the New Zealand government in 1944.

Columbia Pictures acquired the rights to a story in the July 1956 issue of Argosy titled Big Fella Wash Wash, inspired by reminisces from former Echo skipper Meredith "Rip" Riddle. The story was advertised on the cover of the magazine as "The Wackiest Ship in the Army", because the naval vessel had been under Army command while in port, and Columbia used that title when purchasing the story in 1957. The movie never explained any connection between the ship and the Army, puzzling some viewers. (The later television series spelled out the link.)

The director and writer of the film was Richard Murphy, who had written the script for the film You're in the Navy Now (1951). The film was originally developed for Ernie Kovacs in the lead role, with Lemmon as the ensign. But at production time Kovacs was unavailable, and Lemmon was considered too mature for an ensign; Instead, Lemmon was cast in the lead role and popular actor/singer Ricky Nelson in the supporting role.

Though acquired before Operation Petticoat, this film was not released until after that film. The United States Navy provided extensive cooperation allowing the producers to film at Pearl Harbor.

Reception 
Mae Tinee of the Chicago Daily Tribune wrote, "Mr. Lemmon was perfect casting as the [harassed] lieutenant, and young Ricky Nelson is likable as Ensign Hanson. Chips Rafferty and Tom Tully also contribute good performances." She also wrote, "[I]t is, for the most part, excellent entertainment..."

Bosley Crowther of the New York Times wrote, "Let's say it comes out a zany and occasionally amusing farce."

Television series 
The film inspired the 1965 television series of the same name.

USS Echo 
The real USS Echo was returned to the New Zealand government in 1944 and was subsequently used for the conveyance of food and supplies. It was unavailable for either the film or the later television series. The ship eventually served as a bar, but was poorly maintained over the years. In 2015, it was determined to be too derelict to preserve, and was broken up for scrap.

Other ships 
List of other US Navy ships seen in the movie.

 USS Bennington (CV-20)
 USS Finch (DE-328)
 USS Lansing (DE-388)
 USS Brister
 USS Taluga (AO-62)
 USS Manatee (AO-58)
 USS Hamul (AD-20)
 USS Fletcher (DD-445)
 USS Philip (DD-498)
 USS Epperson
 USS Philip (DD-498)
 USS Bagley (DD-386)
 USS Bolster (ARS-38)
 USS Reclaimer (ARS-42)

References

External links
 
 
 
 
 

1960 films
1960 comedy-drama films
1960s American films
1960s English-language films
American comedy-drama films
Columbia Pictures films
Films scored by George Duning
Films adapted into television shows
Films set in Australia
Films set in Papua New Guinea
Films set on ships
Military humor in film
Pacific War films
Films about the United States Navy in World War II
Films set in 1943